Barefoot Gen is a Japanese manga series by Keiji Nakazawa.

Barefoot Gen may also refer to:

Barefoot Gen (1976 film), the first film based on the manga
Barefoot Gen: Explosion of Tears, a 1977 sequel also directed by Tengo Yamada
Barefoot Gen Part 3: Battle of Hiroshima, a 1980 sequel also directed by Tengo Yamada
Barefoot Gen (1983 film), a 1983 animated film loosely based on the manga
Barefoot Gen 2, the 1986 sequel
Barefoot Gen (TV series), a 2007 Japanese television special based on the manga